Brian O'Shea (born 9 December 1944) is a former Irish Labour Party politician. He served as a Teachta Dála (TD) for the Waterford constituency from 1989 to 2011.

O'Shea was born in Waterford and educated at Mount Sion CBS, Waterford and St Patrick's College, Dublin. He worked as a teacher before entering politics. He was elected to Tramore Town Council in 1979, and in 1985 was elected to Waterford City Council and Waterford County Council. He served on these local authorities until 1993.

He first stood for election to Dáil Éireann at the February 1982 general election but was unsuccessful. He stood again at the November 1982 and 1987 general elections but was not elected on either occasion. O'Shea was elected to Seanad Éireann in 1987 on the Industrial and Commercial Panel. Two years later, at the 1989 general election he was first elected to Dáil Éireann for the Waterford constituency.

In 1993 O'Shea was appointed Minister of State at the Department of Agriculture and Food with responsibility for Food and Horticulture. In 1994 he was appointed Minister of State at the Department of Health with responsibility for Mental Handicap, Public Health and Food Safety. He was party spokesperson for Defence (1997–1998); Education; Arts, Heritage, Gaeltacht and the Islands; Communications and Sport (1998–2002); Community, Rural and Gaeltacht Affairs (2002–2007); and Defence and the Irish language (2007–2011).

He retired from politics at the 2011 general election.

References

 

 

 

1944 births
Living people
Alumni of St Patrick's College, Dublin
Irish schoolteachers
Labour Party (Ireland) TDs
Local councillors in County Waterford
Members of the 18th Seanad
Members of the 26th Dáil
Members of the 27th Dáil
Members of the 28th Dáil
Members of the 29th Dáil
Members of the 30th Dáil
Ministers of State of the 27th Dáil
Politicians from County Waterford
Labour Party (Ireland) senators